Saint Cassian of Tangier (or of Tangiers or of Tingis) was a Christian saint of the 3rd century. He is traditionally said to have been beheaded on 3 December, AD 298, during the reign of Diocletian. The Passion of Saint Cassian is appended to that of Saint Marcellus of Tangier.

According to it, he was a court recorder at the trial of St. Marcellus the Centurion. Aurelius Agricola, deputy prefect in the Roman province in North Africa, conducted the trial. When the death penalty was imposed on St. Marcellus, Cassian threw down his pen and declared that he was a Christian. He was arrested immediately and put to death. Cassian is the patron saint of modern stenographers.

Saint Cassian of Tangier is the martyr mentioned by St. Prudentius (born 348) in his hymn Liber Peristephanon (De Coronis Martyrum) (Carmen IV, 45-48 ): "Ingeret Tingis sua Cassianum,
festa Massylum monumenta regum,
qui cinis gentes domitas coegit.
ad iuga Christi."

Notes

Sources
Vincent J. O'Malley, Saints of Africa, ed. Our Sunday Visitor Publishing, 2001, p. 164 

Mauretania Tingitana
Christianity in Morocco
3rd-century births
298 deaths
People from Tangier
3rd-century Christian martyrs
Roman saints from Africa (continent)